This is a list of songs produced by American rapper & producer Rico Love.

Songwriting and Production credits
 "All Because Of You" by Marques Houston (feat. Young Rome)
 "I Wasn't Ready" by Marques Houston
 "I Wish" by Omarion later done by Danity Kane
 "I'm Gon Change" by Omarion
 "U Got Me" by B5
 "I Bet" by TLC (duet with O'so Krispie, the winner of R U the Girl)
 "Seen the Light" by Chris Brown (featuring Rico Love)
 "Baby it's You" by Donell Jones
 "Could This Be Love" by One Chance
 "Smile" by Lea
 "Click, Flash" by Ciara
 "Energy" by Keri Hilson
 "Love Like This" by Natasha Bedingfield (featuring Sean Kingston)
 "Sweet Dreams" by Beyoncé
 "Radio" by Beyoncé
 "Hello Heartbreak" by Michelle Williams
 "The Greatest" by Michelle Williams
 "Lucky Girl" by Michelle Williams
 "Angel" by Natasha Bedingfield
 "Year of the Lover" by Lloyd
 "Your Love" by Pleasure P
 "Boyfriend No. 2" by Pleasure P
 "Shone" by Flo Rida (feat. Pleasure P)
 "Tender Roni (Handcuffin')" by Pleasure P
 "Let Me" by Pleasure P
 "Sayin My Name" by Pleasure P
 "Thinkin' About You" by Mario
 "Soundtrack to My Broken Heart" by Mario
 "Get Out" by Mario
 "Ooh Baby" by Mario
 "Hey Daddy (Daddy's Home)" by Usher (featuring Plies)
 "There Goes My Baby" by Usher
 "In My Bag" by Usher (featuring T.I.)
 "Making Love (Into The Night)" by Usher
 "Straight to the Dance Floor" by Jamie Foxx (featuring Lil' Wayne)
 "So Many Girls" (Produced by Danja, Written by Rico Love) by Usher
 "Hello Good Morning" (Produced by Danja, Written by Rico Love) by Dirty Money
 "Commander" (Produced by David Guetta, written by Rico Love) by Kelly Rowland
 "Gone" by Nelly feat. Kelly Rowland
 "Just A Dream" by Nelly
 "The Kids" (written by Rico Love) by B.o.B
 "All Night Long" by Alexandra Burke featuring Pitbull
 "Making Movies" by Nelly
 "Don't It Feel Good" by Nelly featuring Rico Love
 "Nothing Without Her" by Nelly
 "k.I.s.s (Feat. Diddy-Dirty Money & Murphy Lee)" by Nelly
 "Scream" by Tank
 "Freak" (featuring Rico Love) by Jamie Foxx (Produced with Danja)
 "All Aboard (featuring Lil' Wayne)" by Romeo Santos
 "Ball" (featuring Lil Wayne) by T.I.
 "Up In It" by Wiz Khalifa
 "Grownups" (featuring Rico Love & Mase) by French Montana (Prod. by Rico Love)
 "Long Live A$AP" by A$AP Rocky (Prod. by Jim Jonsin & Rico Love)

Single's Songwriter credits

Songwriting Guest appearances

References

Love, Rico